Daniel Pearson (born 16 July 1996) is an English actor and presenter, best known for his role as Rick Barber in the BAFTA-winning British children's television series, Tracy Beaker Returns and in the BAFTA winning spinoff series, The Dumping Ground.

Career 
Daniel's first role was in 2010 as young Chris Winter in detective television show Vera. In 2012, he starred as main character Rick Barber in the hugely popular, BAFTA winning, children's television series, Tracy Beaker Returns, a comedy drama based around the lives of children in care. In 2012 and 2013, Daniel co-presented BAFTA award-winning British children's entertainment television programme, Friday Download.  
In 2013, he appeared, once again as Rick Barber, in The Dumping Ground, a spin-off of Tracy Beaker Returns, which was very popular. The show won a BAFTA for Best Children's Drama 2013. Also in 2013, Daniel had a recurring role as Luke Salter in soap opera, Emmerdale. Daniel also starred as Rick in the second series of The Dumping Ground, which aired from January to March 2014. His character did not return for the third season, due to wanting a break from acting. He hasn't starred in any other TV programs presumably because he may have quit acting.

Personal life
At the age of 3, Daniel moved with his family, from Darlington to Tadcaster in North Yorkshire, where he has lived ever since with his brother Adam. He took an interest in acting at the age of 12. He joined Kreative talent agency where he gained his first TV role in Vera.

Filmography

References

External links
 

English male television actors
1996 births
Living people
21st-century English male actors
People from Darlington
Actors from County Durham